Bruce Porter (23 February 1865, San Francisco – 25 November 1953, San Francisco) was an American painter, sculptor, stained-glass designer, writer, muralist, landscape designer, and art critic.

Biography
Porter was raised in the East Bay town of Martinez, where his father was the editor of the local newspaper. He later received education in San Francisco, Paris, London, and Venice. He married Margaret Mary “Peggy” James, niece of Henry James, on October 6, 1917 at the Swedenborgian Church in Cambridge, Massachusetts and moved to San Francisco soon thereafter.

Artist
His tonalist paintings, which are rare, include Man and Nature (1903) and Presidio Cliffs which was exhibited at the Panama–Pacific International Exposition (1915). His many murals include those at the Pacific Union Club on Nob Hill and the First Unitarian Church of San Francisco.

Porter's sculptures include the Robert Louis Stevenson monument at Portsmouth Square in San Francisco, and the Memorial Arch (1919) on Saratoga-Los Gatos Road in Saratoga, California.

Designer
Some of Porter's stained-glass designs can be found at St Mary's Episcopal Church in Pacific Grove, California, and in San Francisco at the Swedenborgian Church (1895, Bernard Maybeck), and the Le Petit Trianon mansion (1904). Other stained-glass windows he designed are at churches in Monterey, Stockton, San Mateo and Coronado.

As a landscape designer, Porter created the gardens at the Filoli estate (1917) in Woodside, California, designed the landscape of the Memorial Stadium at the University of California at Berkeley (1923), and was the garden designer for several private residences.

Author
Porter also wrote art criticism columns for local newspapers. For two years, 1895 to 1897, Porter, along with Gelett Burgess and William Doxey, published the literary magazine The Lark. Porter also contributed to Arts in California (1916), a book that compiled the art works exhibited at the Panama–Pacific International Exposition.

References

Further reading
 Artists in California 1786 - 1940 (1989), Edan Milton Hughes
 Dictionary of American Painters, Sculptors and Engravers (1986), Mantle Fielding
 Arts in California (1916), Bruce Porter, Porter Garnett, et al.
 San Francisco Chronicle, 26 November 1953 (obit)
 Saratoga Chamber of Commerce

American designers
19th-century American painters
American male painters
20th-century American painters
American landscape and garden designers
American muralists
American art critics
Sculptors from California
Painters from California
Tonalism
1865 births
1953 deaths
Artists from the San Francisco Bay Area
People from Martinez, California
Writers from San Francisco
American male non-fiction writers
20th-century American sculptors
20th-century American male artists
19th-century American sculptors
American male sculptors
Journalists from California
19th-century American male artists